Daniel Senet (born June 26, 1953 in Amiens) is a French weightlifter and Olympic medalist. He received a silver medal at the 1976 Summer Olympics in Montreal. He finished 4th at the 1980 Summer Olympics in Moscow.

References

1953 births
Living people
Sportspeople from Amiens
French male weightlifters
Olympic weightlifters of France
Weightlifters at the 1976 Summer Olympics
Weightlifters at the 1980 Summer Olympics
Olympic silver medalists for France
Olympic medalists in weightlifting
Medalists at the 1976 Summer Olympics
20th-century French people
21st-century French people